Beware, My Lovely is a 1952 film noir crime film directed by Harry Horner starring Ida Lupino, Robert Ryan and Taylor Holmes. The film is based on the 1950 play The Man by Mel Dinelli, who also wrote the screenplay.

Plot
A widow impulsively hires a handyman to help her with house repairs and cleaning. She quickly discovers Ryan is dangerous.  He keeps her inside the house for the entire day and his manoeuvres, paranoiac imaginings and instability make it impossible for her to summon help or to escape.

Cast
The cast includes the following:
 Ida Lupino as Mrs. Helen Gordon
 Robert Ryan as Howard Wilton
 Taylor Holmes as Mr. Walter Armstrong
 Barbara Whiting as Ruth Williams
 James Willmas as Mr. Stevens
 O. Z. Whitehead as Mr. Franks

Production notes
The play on which the film is based, The Man, was originally a short story by Mel Dinelli. Dinelli adapted the story for the stage. It debuted on Broadway in January 1950, starring Dorothy Gish. The story was also featured on the CBS radio show Suspense as "To Find Help" on January 18, 1945, with Frank Sinatra as Howard and Agnes Moorehead as Mrs Gillis (Mrs Gordon in the film). It was dramatised again on Suspense in 1949 with Gene Kelly and Ethel Barrymore on January 6, 1949.

The movie was shot over an 18-day period in 1951 for Collier Young and Ida Lupino's production company, The Filmakers. Howard Hughes, then the head of RKO Pictures, withheld the film from release for a year. Robert Ryan later said that he felt Hughes tried to "bury" the film because of the fact he was active in left-wing politics, and spoke publicly about his involvement.

The picture of the woman's late husband was actually a photograph of actor William Talman. He was then little known and was not credited.

Reception
According to Bosley Crowther, the film is a "straight tour-de-force situation, clearly contrived and designed for no other positive purpose than to send shivers chasing up and down the spine. And in that respectable endeavor, its success will depend entirely upon how susceptible you are to illogic and little tricks of looming shadows and clutching hands."

Related works
Earlier that year, Lupino and Ryan co-starred in On Dangerous Ground, a film noir directed by Nicholas Ray and produced by John Houseman.

The story was the basis for a 1960 episode of the TV anthology Startime, with Audie Murphy and Thelma Ritter.

References

External links
 
 
 
 

1952 films
1950s thriller films
American black-and-white films
American films based on plays
American thriller films
Films directed by Harry Horner
Film noir
Films scored by Leith Stevens
Films set in 1918
RKO Pictures films
1950s English-language films
1950s American films